Algés River flows into the Tagus River in Algés Parish, Portugal. Since Algés grew, some parts of the river were covered, and now it runs under the ground, including the final stretch to the sea.

Rivers of Portugal
Algés (Oeiras)